Jean Marie Dongou Tsafack (born 20 April 1995), known as Dongou, is a Cameroonian professional footballer who plays as a forward.

Club career
Born in Douala, Dongou joined FC Barcelona in 2008 at the age of 13, arriving through the Samuel Eto'o Foundation. He made his Segunda División debut for the B team on 28 January 2012 before celebrating his 17th birthday, in a match against SD Huesca where he came on as an 85th-minute substitute for Rodri.

Still in the league competition, and still a junior, Dongou scored his first goal for the Catalans' reserves on 25 March 2012, helping to a 2–1 home defeat of CD Alcoyano. He made his first appearances with the main squad during the 2013 preseason, netting twice in his second in a 7–0 rout of Vålerenga Fotball.

Dongou made his competitive debut with Barcelona on 6 December 2013, replacing Alexis Sánchez for the last 12 minutes of the 4–1 win at FC Cartagena in the round of 32 of the Copa del Rey and closing the score. His first game in the UEFA Champions League came five days later, when he featured nine minutes in a 6–1 rout of Celtic in the group stage. He completed a trio of debuts on 19 January of the following year, again coming from the bench away against Levante UD in the La Liga 1–1 draw.

On 22 January 2016, Dongou signed with division two club Real Zaragoza after agreeing to an 18-month deal. On 23 August of the following year, he joined fellow league team Gimnàstic de Tarragona on a four-year contract.

On 10 July 2018, Dongou moved to second-tier side CD Lugo for two years after cutting ties with Nàstic. The following 30 January, he signed with Segunda División B's Lleida Esportiu on loan until the end of the season with an option to make the move permanent in case of promotion.

Dongou terminated his contract with Lugo on 8 August 2019. In February 2020, he joined FC Honka of the Finnish Veikkausliiga.

On 24 September 2022, following a brief spell in Spain with lowly Zamora CF, Dongou moved to the Super League Greece 2 with Anagennisi Karditsa FC.

Personal life
Dongou is a naturalised citizen of Spain.

Club statistics

Honours
Barcelona
Copa Catalunya: 2013–14

Individual
NextGen Series top scorer (shared with Viktor Fischer): 2011–12

References

External links
FC Barcelona official profile

Official website

1995 births
Living people
Naturalised citizens of Spain
Footballers from Douala
Cameroonian footballers
Association football forwards
La Liga players
Segunda División players
Segunda División B players
Primera Federación players
FC Barcelona Atlètic players
FC Barcelona players
Real Zaragoza players
Gimnàstic de Tarragona footballers
CD Lugo players
Lleida Esportiu footballers
Zamora CF footballers
Veikkausliiga players
FC Honka players
Super League Greece 2 players
Anagennisi Karditsa F.C. players
Cameroon under-20 international footballers
Cameroonian expatriate footballers
Expatriate footballers in Spain
Expatriate footballers in Finland
Expatriate footballers in Greece
Cameroonian expatriate sportspeople in Spain
Cameroonian expatriate sportspeople in Finland
Cameroonian expatriate sportspeople in Greece